Freiwilliger Helfer der Grenztruppen (FHG) (Voluntary Auxiliary of the Border Police) were established in 1958 as civilian helpers to the border troops of the German Democratic Republic. Their official role was in "active participation in ensuring public order and security for the protection of workers". Their assistance to the border troops thus made their "social contribution to the consolidation of socialism on German soil". Their primary task, however, was to detect and thwart possible escape attempts to the west. On October 2, 1990, the legal basis for this activity was suspended in the course of the German reunification.

History of the FHG

14 May 1955 saw the accession to the Warsaw Pact of the GDR, with which the inner German border became the dividing line between two opposing military blocs (NATO and Warsaw Pact) and social systems. On 25 August 1952, the first 543 volunteers of the border police had been called in to secure the border, not yet under their later official name. The membership in the Warsaw Pact demanded that the GDR leadership increase the protection of the inner German border. Therefore, on 1 December 1955, the border police took over securing the entire state border of the GDR, including the borders with the People's Republic of Poland and Czechoslovakia. The border with West Berlin at that time was completely defeated by the Soviet administration in Berlin. As a result, the party and state authorities passed resolutions and regulations to support the border police, which did not have enough resources to cover the inner-German border nationwide. 

The regulations concerned both the change in the current structure and the training and equipment of the border police. However, it was foreseeable that in spite of this restructuring, the tasks could only be completely fulfilled by the help of the population of the residential areas close to the border. The state government activated all state-owned local bodies in the respective border areas and massively called on the population to help protect the state border. Compared to the People's Police, which at that time already had tens of thousands of helpers, the border guards brought only a few thousand. However, this was enough to create the conditions for adopting the ordinance on 5 June 1958 for the approval of volunteers in support of the German Border Police.

In 1961 the Border Police were renamed as Border Troops, therefore the denomination was changed to Freiwilliger Helfer der Grenztruppen (Voluntary Auxiliary of the Border Troops). Officially the FHG should assist the Border Troops to maintain public safety and the socialist system. Unofficially the main target was to close off the German border to West Germany and to prevent East Germans from fleeing to West Germany. The FHG volunteers fulfilled their patrol missions in plain clothes, but were identifiable by their armband. This auxiliary service was defunct a few days before the German reunification in 1990.

Duties and responsibilities
The FHG had the right to check ID cards, to stop cars close to the border and were also called for search and manhunt operations.

See also
 Auxiliary police
 Border Troops of the German Democratic Republic

References

Berlin Wall
GDR Border Troops
1958 establishments in East Germany
1990 disestablishments in East Germany
Law enforcement in East Germany
Auxiliary police units